This topic covers notable events and articles related to 2020 in music.

Specific locations

African music
American music
Asian music
Australian music
Brazilian music
British music
Canadian music
Chinese music
Czech music
Danish music
European music
Finnish music
French music
German music
Icelandic music
Indian music
Indonesian music
Irish music
Japanese music
Latin music
Malaysian music
Mongolian music
Norwegian music
Philippine music
Polynesian music
Scandinavian music
South Korean music
Swedish music
Taiwanese music 
Vietnamese music

Specific genres

Classical
Country
Electronic
Jazz
Latin
Heavy metal
Hip hop
Rock

Albums released

Awards

Bands formed

 1st.One
 Aespa
 All at Once
 Arcana Project
 BAE173
 Blackswan
 BonBon Girls 303
 B.O.Y
 Botopass
 BtoB 4U
 Chō Tokimeki Sendenbu
 Cignature
 Citi Zēni
 Cravity
 DKB
 Drippin
 E'Last
 Enhypen
 Ghost9
 Go to the Beds
 H&D
 JO1
 The Lucid
 Lucy
 Lunarsolar
 MCND
 Morfonica
 Nemophila
 NiziU
 Orbit
 Paradises
 Piggs
 P1Harmony
 Redsquare
 Red Velvet - Irene & Seulgi
 Refund Sisters
 Sakurazaka46
 Secret Number
 SixTones
 Snow Man
 SSAK3
 STAYC
 TO1
 Treasure
 UNVS
 Weeekly
 WEi
 Woo!ah!
 WJSN Chocome
 Zamb

Soloist debuts

 Ado
 Ai Furihata
 Aina Suzuki
 Akane Kumada
 Alexa Ilacad
 Amee
 Anson Kong
 Anson Lo
 Ashton Irwin
 Azumi Waki
 Bang Ye-dam
 Central Cee
 Curley Gao
 Dixie D'Amelio
 Denis Stoff
 Emma Heesters
 Emman
 Fujii Kaze
 Gakuto Kajiwara
 Han Seung-woo
 Haruka Kudō
 Hayley Williams
 Heo Chan-mi
 Hikaru
 Hoshimachi Suisei
 Ivana Alawi
 Jamie Miller
 Jer Lau
 Kai
 Karin Miyamoto
 Keiko
 Ken
 Kim Nam-joo
 Kim Woo-seok
 Koutaro Nishiyama
 Lee Eun-sang
 Lee Su-hyun
 Liyuu
 Maine Mendoza
 Max
 Miki Satō
 Mimiyuuuh
 Mimi Webb
 Moon Jong-up
 Nanaka Suwa
 Nana Mori
 Natty
 Nessa Barrett
 Ong Seong-wu
 Reina Washio
 Riho Sayashi
 Ryota Katayose
 Ryu Su-jeong
 Sae Ōtsuka
 Sangiovanni
 Seo Eun-kwang
 Serri
 Solar
 Suho
 Takuya Kimura
 Tomori Kusunoki
 Win Morisaki
 Wonho
 YooA
 Yook Sung-jae
 Yoon Doo-joon
 Yui Ninomiya
 Yuki Nakashima
 Yurina Hirate
Zild

Bands reformed
The Format
Genesis
Linkin Park
The Network
Rage Against the Machine
RBD
Toto

Bands on hiatus
 100%
 AAA
 Anathema
 Arashi
 B.A.P
 Baroque
 College Cosmos
 DEL48
 Good Morning America
 Ladies' Code
 Ladybaby
 Masahiko Kondō
 Marius Yo
 Mrs. Green Apple
 Real Friends
 Teen Top
 Sleep
 Stone Sour
 Winner
 ZE:A

Bands disbanded

 1the9
 Babes in Toyland
 Badkiz
 Bay City Rollers
 Black Dresses
 Carry Loose
 Columbia University Marching Band
 Default
 E-girls
 Fairies
 Gang of Four
 Group Tamashii
 Gugudan
 Hachimitsu Rocket
 Hinapia
 Household Gods
 Joan of Arc
 Madvillain
 Magnolia Factory
 Masc
 Mission of Burma
 Nachtmystium
 NeonPunch
 Party Rockets GT
 PrizmaX
 Psychic TV
 She Wants Revenge
 Spectrum
 Sora tob sakana
 SudannaYuzuYully
 The Spencer Davis Group
 SSAK3
 Tegomass
 Uijin
 Van Halen
 X1

Deaths

January
 1 
 Lexii Alijai, 21, American rapper
 Marty Grebb, 74, American rock keyboardist and multi-instrumentalist (The Buckinghams, Chicago)
 Tommy Hancock, 90, American country singer 
 2 – Lorraine Chandler, 73, American soul singer
 3 – Bo Winberg, 80, Swedish rock guitarist (The Spotnicks)
 4 – Emanuel Borok, 75, Russian-born American classical violinist
 5 – Martin Griffin, British space rock drummer (Hawkwind, Hawklords)
 7 – Neil Peart, 67, Canadian progressive rock drummer and lyricist (Rush)
 8 – Edd Byrnes, 87, American actor and pop singer
 9 
 Tom Alexander, 85, Scottish folk accordionist (The Alexander Brothers)
 Bobby Comstock, 78, American rock and roll singer
 10 – Wolfgang Dauner, 84, German jazz pianist
 13
 Demetri Callas, 77, American rock guitarist and singer (The Four Seasons)
 Hylda Sims, 87, British skiffle guitarist
 14 
 Steve Martin Caro, 71, American baroque pop singer (The Left Banke)
 Chamín Correa, 90, Mexican classical guitarist
 Guy Deplus, 95, French chamber music clarinetist
 Barry Mayger, 73, English pop bassist (Chicory Tip)
 Bruno Nettl, 89, Czech-born American ethnomusicologist and musicologist
 15 – Chris Darrow, 75, American country and rock singer and multi-instrumentalist (Kaleidoscope, Nitty Gritty Dirt Band)
 18 
 Dennis Garcia, 67, Filipino pop rock bassist (Hotdog)
 David Olney, 71, American folk singer-songwriter
 19
 Dan Andrei Aldea, 69, Romanian progressive rock singer and multi-instrumentalist (Sfinx)
 Jimmy Heath, 93, American jazz saxophonist (Heath Brothers)
 Robert Parker, 89, American R&B singer
 Sunanda Patnaik, 85, Indian classical singer
 21 – Meritxell Negre, 48, Spanish pop singer (Peaches & Herb)
 24
 Joe Payne, 35, American metal bassist (Divine Heresy, Nile)
 Sean Reinert, 48, American metal drummer (Cynic, Death, Æon Spoke)
 25
 Bob Gullotti, 71, American free jazz drummer (Surrender to the Air)
 Vernon Sandusky, 80, American rock singer and guitarist (The Chartbusters)
 26 – Bob Shane, 85, American folk singer and guitarist (The Kingston Trio)
 27 – Reed Mullin, 53, American sludge metal drummer (Corrosion of Conformity)
 28 – Bob Nave, 75, American bubblegum pop keyboardist (The Lemon Pipers)
 30 – Lucien Barbarin, 63, American jazz trombonist (Preservation Hall Jazz Band, Harry Connick Jr.)

February
 1 
 Harold Beane, 73, American funk guitarist (Funkadelic)
 Andy Gill, 64, British post-punk guitarist (Gang of Four)
 Peter Serkin, 72, American classical pianist
 2 
 Kofi B, Ghanaian highlife singer
 Ivan Král, 71, Czech-American rock bassist and songwriter (The Patti Smith Group)
 4 
 Andrew Brough, New Zealand indie rock singer, songwriter, and guitarist (Straitjacket Fits)
 Buddy Cage, 73, Canadian folk pedal steel guitarist (New Riders of the Purple Sage, Great Speckled Bird)
 Ljiljana Petrović, 80, Serbian pop singer
 6
 Lynn Evans, 95, American pop singer (The Chordettes)
 Diego Farias, 27, American progressive metalcore guitarist (Volumes)
 Nello Santi, 88, Italian classical conductor
 7 
 Nexhmije Pagarusha, 86, Albanian-Kosovan pop singer
 Steve Weber, 76, American folk singer and guitarist (The Holy Modal Rounders)
 8 – Robert Conrad, 84, American actor and singer
 9 – Sergei Slonimsky, 87, Russian classical composer
 10 – Lyle Mays, 66, American jazz fusion keyboardist (Pat Metheny Group)
 11 – Joseph Shabalala, 78, South African isicathamiya and mbube singer (Ladysmith Black Mambazo)
 12 
 Paul English, 87, American country drummer
 Victor Olaiya, 89, Nigerian highlife trumpeter
 13 
 Buzzy Linhart, 76, American folk rock singer-songwriter
 Jacob Thiele, 40, American indie rock keyboardist (The Faint)
 14
 Reinbert de Leeuw, 81, Dutch classical pianist and conductor
 Sonam Sherpa, 48, Indian blues rock guitarist (Parikrama)
 15 – Cavan Grogan, 70, Welsh rock and roll singer (Crazy Cavan and the Rhythm Rockers)
 16
 Pearl Carr, 98, British pop singer (Pearl Carr & Teddy Johnson)
 Graeme Allwright, 93, New Zealand-French folk and jazz singer-songwriter
 17
 Kizito Mihigo, 38, Rwandan gospel singer
 Andrew Weatherall, 56, British electronic musician (Two Lone Swordsmen, The Sabres of Paradise) and record producer
 18 – Jon Christensen, 78, Norwegian jazz drummer
 19
 Bob Cobert, 95, American composer
 Pop Smoke, 20, American rapper
 24
 David Roback, 61, American alternative rock and dream pop guitarist (Mazzy Star, Rain Parade, Opal)
 Jahn Teigen, 70, Norwegian pop and progressive rock singer (Popol Ace, Prima Vera)
 26 
 Hans Deinzer, 86, German classical clarinetist
 Sergei Dorensky, 88, Russian classical pianist
 27 – Lillian Offitt, 81, American blues and R&B singer
 28 – Mike Somerville, 67, American rock guitarist and songwriter (Head East)
 29 
 Odile Pierre, 87, French classical organist and composer
 Bill Smith, 93, American classical and jazz clarinetist

March
 2
 Jan Vyčítal, 77, Czech country singer
 Susan Weinert, 54, German jazz fusion guitarist
 Peter Wieland, 89, German pop singer
 3
 Les Cauchi, 77, American pop singer (Johnny Maestro & the Brooklyn Bridge)
 Alf Cranner, 83, Norwegian folk singer
 4 – Barbara Martin, 76, American R&B singer (The Supremes)
 6 
 McCoy Tyner, 81, American jazz pianist
 Elinor Ross, 93, American opera soprano
 7 
 Jim Owen, 78, American country singer-songwriter
 Laura Smith, Canadian folk singer-songwriter
 9
 Keith Olsen, 74, American psychedelic rock bassist (The Music Machine) and record producer
 Eric Taylor, 70, American folk singer-songwriter
 10 
 Marcelo Peralta, 59, Argentine jazz saxophonist
 Beba Selimović, 80, Bosnian folk singer
 11 – Charles Wuorinen, 81, American classical composer
 12 – Don Burrows, 91, Australian jazz multi-instrumentalist
 14
 Phil Phillips, 94, American pop singer-songwriter
 Eva Pilarová, 80, Czech jazz singer
 Genesis P-Orridge, 70, British industrial singer, songwriter and bassist (Throbbing Gristle, Psychic TV, Thee Majesty)
 Diane Ray, 74, American pop singer
 16 
 Sergio Bassi, 69, Italian folk rock singer-songwriter
 Ted Cahill, 72, American garage rock guitarist (The Magic Mushrooms)
 Jason Rainey, 53, American thrash metal guitarist (Sacred Reich)
 17 – Thái Thanh, 85, Vietnamese-American pop singer
 19 – Aurlus Mabélé, 66, Congolese soukous singer
 20 
 Kenny Rogers, 81, American country and pop singer-songwriter
 Jerry Slick, 80, American psychedelic rock drummer (The Great Society)
 21 – Hellmut Stern, 91, German classical violinist
 22 
 Gabi Delgado-López, 61, Spanish-born German electronic singer (Deutsch Amerikanische Freundschaft)
 Julie Felix, 81, American-British folk singer
 Mike Longo, 83, American jazz pianist
 Peter Stapleton, 65, New Zealand alternative rock drummer (The Terminals, Dadamah, Flies Inside the Sun)
 Eric Weissberg, 80, American country and bluegrass banjoist
 23 – Tres Warren, 41, American psychedelic rock singer and guitarist (Psychic Ills)
 24 
 Manu Dibango, 86, Cameroonian makossa and jazz saxophonist
 Bill Rieflin, 59, American rock drummer (The Blackouts, Ministry, Revolting Cocks, KMFDM, King Crimson)
 25 – Detto Mariano, 82, Italian rock keyboardist (I Ribelli) and film composer
 26 
 Olle Holmquist, 83, Swedish big band trombonist (James Last Orchestra)
 Bill Martin, 81, British pop songwriter
 27 
 Bob Andy, 75, Jamaican reggae singer-songwriter (The Paragons, Bob and Marcia)
 Don Burch, 81, American doo-wop singer (The Slades)
 Mirna Doris, 79, Italian canzone Napoletana singer
 Delroy Washington, 67, Jamaican-born British reggae singer
 28 – Jan Howard, 91, American country singer-songwriter
 29 
 Joe Diffie, 61, American country singer and songwriter
 Alan Merrill, 69, American pop rock singer and bassist (Arrows)
 Paravai Muniyamma, 82, Indian folk singer
 Krzysztof Penderecki, 86, Polish classical composer and conductor
 30 
 Riachão, 98, Brazilian samba singer
 Bill Withers, 81, American soul singer-songwriter
 31
 Cristina, 61, American new wave singer
 Wallace Roney, 59, American jazz trumpeter

April
 1 
 Ellis Marsalis Jr., 85, American jazz pianist
 Bucky Pizzarelli, 94, American jazz guitarist
 Harold Rubin, 87, South African-born Israeli free jazz clarinetist
 Adam Schlesinger, 52, American power pop singer, songwriter and bassist (Fountains of Wayne, Ivy, Tinted Windows)
 2 – Vaughan Mason, 69, American funk and electronic multi-instrumentalist (Vaughan Mason & Crew, Raze)
 3 – Helin Bölek, 28, Turkish folk rock singer (Grup Yorum)
 4
 Timothy Brown, 82, American pop and soul singer
 Patrick Gibson, French eurodisco drummer (Gibson Brothers)
 Alex Harvey, 73, American country singer-songwriter
 5 – Barry Allen, 74, Canadian rock musician and record producer (Painter) (death announced on this date)
 6 
 M. K. Arjunan, 84, Indian film composer
 Black the Ripper, 32, British grime rapper
 7
 Betty Bennett, 98, American jazz and big band singer
 Hutch Davie, 89, American pianist, arranger and composer
 Steve Farmer, 71, American rock guitarist and songwriter (The Amboy Dukes)
 Travis Nelsen, American indie rock drummer (Okkervil River)
 John Prine, 73, American folk singer-songwriter
 Hal Willner, 64, American record producer
 Xudeydi, 91, Somali folk oud player
 8
 Carl Dobkins, Jr., 79, American singer and songwriter
 Glenn Fredly, 44, Indonesian R&B singer-songwriter
 Chynna Rogers, 25, American rapper
 9 
 Andy González, 69, American Latin jazz bassist
 Dmitri Smirnov, 71, Russian-British classical composer
 10 
 Big George Brock, 87, American blues harmonicist
 Shanti Hiranand, 86, Indian classical singer
 Jymie Merritt, 92, American jazz bassist (The Jazz Messengers)
 11 – Liu Dehai, 82, Chinese classical pipa player
 12
 Jerry Hludzik, American pop rock guitarist and bassist (The Buoys)
 Louis van Dijk, 78, Dutch jazz pianist
 13
 Ryo Kawasaki, 73, Japanese jazz fusion guitarist
 Moraes Moreira, 72, Brazilian MPB singer and guitarist (Novos Baianos)
 14
 Akin Euba, 84, Nigerian folk pianist, composer, and musicologist
 Kassongo Wa Kanema, 73, Congolese soukous singer (Orchestra Super Mazembe)
 Kerstin Meyer, 92, Swedish opera singer
 15 
 Henry Grimes, 84, American jazz bassist
 Lee Konitz, 92, American jazz saxophonist
 Gary McSpadden, 77, American gospel singer (The Imperials, Gaither Vocal Band, The Oak Ridge Boys)
 16
 Christophe, 74, French singer-songwriter
 Dušan Vančura, 82, Czech folk singer and bassist (Spirituál kvintet)
 17 
 Giuseppi Logan, 84, American jazz multi-instrumentalist
 Matthew Seligman, 62, British new wave bassist (Bruce Woolley and the Camera Club, The Soft Boys, Thompson Twins)
 19
 Alexander Vustin, 76, Russian composer
 Ian Whitcomb, 78, British pop singer-songwriter
 Emina Zečaj, 91, Bosnian sevdalinka singer
 21
 Derek Jones, 35, American metalcore guitarist (Falling in Reverse)
 Jacques Pellen, 63, French jazz guitarist
 Florian Schneider, 73, German krautrock and electronic multi-instrumentalist (Kraftwerk, Organisation)
 22 
 Bootsie Barnes, 82, American jazz saxophonist
 Marcos Mundstock, 77, Argentine comedy music singer and multi-instrumentalist (Les Luthiers)
 23 
 Fred the Godson, 35, American rapper
 Kamit Sanbayev, 78, Kazakh rock singer (Dos Mukasan)
 24 
 Hamilton Bohannon, 78, American R&B and disco percussionist and music producer
 Phil Broadhurst, 70, New Zealand jazz pianist
 Harold Reid, 80, American country singer-songwriter (The Statler Brothers)
 25
 Alan Abel, 91, American classical percussionist
 Ronald Frangipane, 75, American session keyboardist (The Archies)
 26 – Big Al Carson, 66, American blues singer
 27
 Lynn Harrell, 79, American classical cellist
 Troy Sneed, 52, American gospel singer
 Scott Taylor, British new wave guitarist (Then Jerico)
 28 – Bobby Lewis, 95, American R&B singer
 29
 Martin Lovett, 93, British classical cellist (Amadeus Quartet)
 Stezo, 52, American rapper
 30
 Tony Allen, 79, Nigerian afrobeat and rock drummer (Fela Kuti and Afrika '70, The Good, the Bad & the Queen)
 Óscar Chávez, 85, Mexican pop singer
 Sam Lloyd, 56, American a cappella singer (The Blanks)

Date unknown
 Ceybil Jefferies, American house and R&B singer

May
 1 
 Richard Cole, 72, American jazz saxophonist
 Tavo Limongi, 52, Mexican nu metal guitarist (Resorte)
 Will Theunissen, 65, Dutch jazz rock guitarist
 2 
 Cady Groves, 30, American country singer-songwriter
 Idir, 70, Algerian folk singer-songwriter
 Jonathan Kelly, 72, Irish folk rock singer-songwriter
 Erwin Prasetya, 48, Indonesian alternative rock bassist (Dewa 19)
 3
 Rosalind Elias, 90, American opera singer
 Dave Greenfield, 71, British punk and new wave keyboardist (The Stranglers)
 Bob Lander, 78, Swedish rock singer and guitarist (The Spotnicks)
 Lorne Munroe, 95, Canadian-born American classical cellist
 4 
 John Erhardt, American indie rock musician (Wussy, Ass Ponys)
 Frederick C. Tillis, 90, American jazz saxophonist
 Dragan Vučić, 65, Macedonian pop singer
 5
 Sweet Pea Atkinson, 74, American dance-rock singer (Was (Not Was))
 Sonny Cox, 82, American jazz saxophonist
 Didi Kempot, 53, Indonesian campursari singer
 Ciro Pessoa, 62, Brazilian post-punk singer-songwriter and guitarist (Titãs, Cabine C)
 Kiing Shooter, 24, American rapper
 Millie Small, 73, Jamaican ska and reggae singer-songwriter
 6
 Norbert Balatsch, 92, Austrian choral conductor
 Brian Howe, 66, British rock singer-songwriter (Bad Company)
 7
 İbrahim Gökçek, 41, Turkish folk rock bassist (Grup Yorum)
 Andre Harrell, 59, American record producer, songwriter, rapper (Dr. Jeckyll & Mr. Hyde), and founder of Uptown Records
 Ty, 47, British rapper
 8 – Mark Barkan, 85, American songwriter, record producer, and musical director for The Banana Splits Adventure Hour 
 9
 Joe Hupp, 78, American rock musician (The Smoke Ring)
 Little Richard, 87, American rock and roll singer and pianist
 10
 David Corrêa, 82, Brazilian samba singer 
 Betty Wright, 66, American soul and R&B singer and songwriter
 11 – Moon Martin, 74, American rockabilly singer-songwriter and guitarist
 12 – Takami Asano, Japanese psychedelic rock guitarist (Godiego)
 13
 Gabriel Bacquier, 95, French opera singer 
 Yoshio, 60, Mexican pop singer
 14 – Jorge Santana, 68, Mexican rock guitarist (Malo, Santana)
 15 
 Denny DeMarchi, 57, Canadian rock keyboardist (Alias, The Cranberries)
 Sergio Denis, 71, Argentine pop singer
 Phil May, 75, British rock singer-songwriter (Pretty Things)
 17 
 Lucky Peterson, 55, American blues guitarist
 Peter Thomas, 94, German film composer
 19 – Willie K, 59, American folk ukuleleist
 21
 Berith Bohm, 87, Swedish opera singer
 Bobby Digital, 59, Jamaican dancehall producer
 Neil Howlett, 85, British opera singer
 22 
 Steve Hanford, 50, American punk rock drummer (Poison Idea)
 Mory Kanté, 70, Guinean folk singer and kora player
 KJ Balla, 23, American rapper
 Klaus Selmke, 70, German rock drummer (City)
 24
 Jimmy Cobb, 91, American jazz drummer (Miles Davis Quintet)
 Lily Lian, 103, French pop singer
 Al Rex, 91, American rock and roll bassist (Bill Haley & His Comets)
 25 – Bucky Baxter, 65, American folk and rock guitarist
 26
 Brendan Bowyer, 81, Irish rock and roll singer
 Charlie Monttana, 58, Mexican rock singer
 Lennie Niehaus, 90, American jazz saxophonist and film composer
 27 – Evaldo Gouveia, 91, Brazilian MPB singer
 28 – Bob Kulick, 70, American hard rock guitarist (Balance, Kiss, W.A.S.P.)
 30 
 Mady Mesplé, 89, French opera singer
 John Nzenze, 79–80, Kenyan rock and jazz guitarist
 31
 Bob Northern, 86, American jazz French hornist
 Kjeld Wennick, 76, Danish banjoist and singer (Jan & Kjeld)

June
 1
 Majek Fashek, 57, Nigerian reggae singer and songwriter
 Joey Image, 63, American punk rock drummer (Misfits)
 2 – Chris Trousdale, 34, American pop singer (Dream Street)
 4
 Marcello Abbado, 93, Italian classical pianist and composer
 Rupert Hine, 72, British jazz-rock singer and keyboardist (Quantum Jump)
 Steve Priest, 72, British glam rock guitarist (The Sweet)
 5 – Marjan, 72, Iranian pop singer
 7 
 Frank Bey, 74, American blues singer
 Floyd Lee, 86, American blues singer and guitarist
 8 
 James Hand, 67, American country singer
 Bonnie Pointer, 69, American R&B singer (The Pointer Sisters)
 9
 Paul Chapman, 66, Welsh hard rock guitarist (UFO, Lone Star)
 Pau Donés, 53, Spanish pop rock singer-songwriter and guitarist (Jarabe de Palo)
 12
 Dodo Doris, 71, Congolese soukous drummer (Orchestra Super Mazembe)
 Ricky Valance, 84, Welsh pop singer
 14
 Keith Tippett, 72, British free jazz and progressive rock pianist (King Crimson, Centipede)
 15
 Rocky Isaac, 73, American pop-rock drummer (The Cherry People)
 Nana Tuffour, 66, Ghanaian highlife singer
 16 – Yohan, 28, South Korean K-pop singer (TST)
 17 – Hugh Fraser, 67, Canadian jazz pianist and trombonist
 18
 Hux Brown, 75, Jamaican reggae guitarist (Toots and the Maytals)
 Vera Lynn, 103, British pop singer
 19 – A. L. Raghavan, 86, Indian playback singer
 20 – Aaron Tokona, 45, New Zealand alternative rock guitarist (Weta, Cairo Knife Fight, Fly My Pretties)
 21
 Jeet Singh Negi, 95, Indian folk singer-songwriter
 Joan Pau Verdier, 73, French nòva cançon singer
 23 – Margarita Pracatan, 89, Cuban novelty singer
 24
 Michael Hawley, 58, American classical pianist and academic
 Claude Le Péron, 72, French rock bassist
 25 
 Huey, 32, American rapper
 Graeme Williamson, Canadian new wave singer and guitarist (Pukka Orchestra)
 26 – Tami Lynn, 81, American soul singer
 27
 Pete Carr, 70, American rock, pop and soul guitarist (Muscle Shoals Rhythm Section, Hour Glass, LeBlanc & Carr)
 Freddy Cole, 88, American jazz singer and pianist
 Tom Finn, 71, American baroque pop guitarist (The Left Banke)
 Mats Rådberg, 72, Swedish country singer and guitarist
 28 – Simon H. Fell, 61, British jazz bassist
 29 
 Steppa J. Groggs, 32, American rapper (Injury Reserve)
 Johnny Mandel, 94, American jazz and film composer
 Benny Mardones, 73, American soft rock singer-songwriter
 Willie Wright, 80, American soul singer

July
 1 – Max Crook, 83, American pop rock keyboardist
 3 – J. Marvin Brown, 66, American soul singer (The Softones)
 5
 Cleveland Eaton, 80, American jazz bassist (Ramsey Lewis Trio)
 John Marascalco, 89, American songwriter and record producer
 6
 Charlie Daniels, 83, American country singer-songwriter and fiddler
 Andrew Kishore, 64, Bangladeshi playback singer
 Ennio Morricone, 91, Italian film composer
 8 – Naya Rivera, 33, American pop singer and actress
 10 – Eddie Gale, 78, American jazz trumpeter (Sun Ra's Arkestra)
 11
 Gabriella Tucci, 90, Italian opera singer
 Rich Priske, 52, Canadian rock bassist (Matthew Good Band)
 12
 Rod Bernard, 79, American swamp pop singer
 Judy Dyble, 71, British folk singer-songwriter and autoharpist (Fairport Convention, Trader Horne)
 Eleanor Sokoloff, 106, American classical pianist
 14
 J. J. Lionel, 72, Belgian pop singer
 Raúl Pagano, Argentine rock keyboardist (Bersuit Vergarabat)
 16 
 Ken Chinn, 57, Canadian punk rock singer (SNFU)
 Jamie Oldaker, 68, American country drummer (The Tractors)
 Víctor Víctor, 71, Dominican folk singer and guitarist
 18 – Haruma Miura, 30, Japanese pop singer and actor
 19 – Emitt Rhodes, 70, American pop rock singer-songwriter and multi-instrumentalist (The Merry-Go-Round, The Palace Guard)
 21
 Dobby Dobson, 77, Jamaican reggae singer
 Annie Ross, 89, British-American jazz singer (Lambert, Hendricks & Ross)
 Mieko Hirota, 73, Japanese kayokyoku singer
 22 – Tim Smith, 59, British progressive rock singer and guitarist (Cardiacs, The Sea Nymphs, Spratleys Japs)
 24 – Regis Philbin, 88, American television personality and singer
 25 
 Peter Green, 73, English blues rock singer-songwriter and guitarist (Fleetwood Mac)
 CP Lee, 70, British comedy rock singer and guitarist (Alberto y Lost Trios Paranoias)
 27 
 Denise Johnson, 56, British alternative rock singer (Primal Scream)
 Miss Mercy, 71, American psychedelic rock singer (The GTOs)
 28
 Pepe Cardona, 72, American pop-rock singer (Alive 'N Kickin')
 Bent Fabric, 95, Danish classical pianist and composer
 29 
Balla Sidibé, 79, Senegalese son cubano singer and timbalero (Orchestra Baobab)
 Malik B., 47, American rapper (The Roots)
 30
 Randy Barlow, 77, American country singer
 Sonam Tshering Lepcha, 92, Indian folk singer
 31 – Bill Mack, 88, American country singer-songwriter

August
 2 
 Leon Fleisher, 92, American classical pianist
 Steve Holland, 66, American Southern rock guitarist (Molly Hatchet, Gator Country)
 Larry Novak, 87, American jazz pianist
 4
 Tony Costanza, 52, American heavy metal drummer (Machine Head, Crowbar)
 5
 Agathonas Iakovidis, 65, Greek folk singer
 Jan Savage, 77, American garage rock guitarist (The Seeds)
 6
 Wayne Fontana, 74, British pop singer (The Mindbenders)
 Vern Rumsey, 47, American post-hardcore and indie rock bassist (Unwound, Blonde Redhead, Household Gods)
 7 – Mark Wirtz, 76, French pop singer
 9
 Salome Bey, 80, American-born Canadian soul singer
 Martin Birch, 71, British music producer and recording engineer
 10 – Don Martin, New Zealand new wave bassist (Mi-Sex)
 11
 Belle du Berry, 54, French chanson singer (Paris Combo)
 Pat Fairley, 76, Scottish pop rock singer and bassist (Marmalade)
 Trini Lopez, 83, American pop singer
 13 – Steve Grossman, 69, American jazz fusion saxophonist
 14
 Julian Bream, 87, British classical guitarist
 Ewa Demarczyk, 79, Polish cabaret singer and poet
 Valentina Legkostupova, 54, Russian pop singer
 Pete Way, 69, English rock bassist (UFO, Waysted, Fastway)
 16 – Emman, 21, Filipino pop singer
 17 – Jasraj, 90, Indian classical singer
 18 
 Ron Heathman, American rock guitarist (Supersuckers)
 Sean Pentecost, Australian alternative metal drummer (Superheist)
 Hal Singer, 100, American jazz saxophonist and bandleader
 19
 Randall Craig Fleischer, 61, American classical conductor
 Todd Nance, 57, American jam band drummer (Widespread Panic)
 20 
 Frankie Banali, 68, American hard rock drummer (Quiet Riot, W.A.S.P.)
 Justin Townes Earle, 38, American folk singer-songwriter
 Mike Kirkland, 82, American folk musician (The Brothers Four)
 Jack Sherman, 64, American funk rock guitarist (Red Hot Chili Peppers)
 Piotr Szczepanik, 78, Polish pop singer
 22
 Walter Lure, 71, American punk rock guitarist (The Heartbreakers)
 D. J. Rogers, 72, American soul singer
 23 
 Peter King, 80, American jazz saxophonist and clarinetist
 Charlie Persip, 91, American jazz drummer
 24 – Riley Gale, 34, American thrash metal singer (Power Trip)
 25
 Georges Bœuf, 82, French opera composer and saxophonist
 Mick Hart, Australian folk singer
 Gerry McGhee, 58, British-Canadian hard rock singer (Brighton Rock)
 27 
 Archana Mahanta, 71, Indian folk singer
 Mike Noga, 43, Australian alternative rock drummer (The Drones, Legends of Motorsport)

September
 1 
 John Meyer, 67, Australian rock slide guitarist (Rose Tattoo, Chain)
 Ian Mitchell, 62, British pop rock bassist (Bay City Rollers)
 Erick Morillo, 49, Colombian-American house and eurodance DJ (Reel 2 Real)
 2 – Alexander Priko, 46, Russian pop rock keyboardist (Laskovyi Mai)
 3 – Bill Pursell, 94, American easy listening composer
 4 
 Gary Peacock, 85, American jazz double-bassist
 Lucille Starr, 82, Canadian country singer
 6 – Bruce Williamson, 49, American R&B singer (The Temptations)
 7 – Xavier Ortiz, 48, Mexican pop singer (Garibaldi)
 8
 Simeon Coxe, 82, American electronic rock singer and synthesizer player (Silver Apples)
 Vexi Salmi, 77, Finnish pop rock lyricist
 9 
 Ronald Bell, 68, American funk saxophonist (Kool & The Gang)
 Sid McCray, American punk rock singer (Bad Brains)
 10 – Danny Webster, 61, American funk singer and guitarist (Slave)
 11 
 Toots Hibbert, 77, Jamaican reggae singer-songwriter (Toots & The Maytals)
 Reggie Johnson, 79, American jazz bassist
 12 – Edna Wright, 76, American R&B singer (Honey Cone)
 14
 Al Kasha, 83, American pop songwriter
 Peter Starkie, 72, Australian rock guitarist (Skyhooks, Jo Jo Zep & The Falcons)
 16 – Roy C, 81, American soul singer
 18 
 Georgia Dobbins, 78, American R&B singer (The Marvelettes) and songwriter
 Pamela Hutchinson, 62, American R&B singer (The Emotions)
 19 
 Lee Kerslake, 73, British hard rock drummer (Uriah Heep, Ozzy Osbourne, Toe Fat)
 Dave Kusworth, 60, British indie rock singer (Jacobites)
 21
 Hamdi Benani, 77, Algerian pop singer and violinist
 Tommy DeVito, 92, American pop singer and guitarist (The Four Seasons)
 Roy Head, 79, American country singer-songwriter
 Ira Sullivan, 89, American jazz trumpeter
 23 
 Juliette Gréco, 93, French chanson singer
 W. S. Holland, 85, American country drummer (The Tennessee Three, The Great Eighties Eight)
 24 – Max Merritt, 79, New Zealand soul singer-songwriter and guitarist
 25 – S. P. Balasubrahmanyam, 74, Indian playback singer
 26
 Masayoshi Kabe, 70, Japanese rock guitarist and bassist (The Golden Cups, Speed, Glue & Shinki, Vodka Collins)
 Mark Stone, American hard rock bassist (Van Halen)
 Jimmy Winston, 75, British rock keyboardist (Small Faces)
 28 – Jackie Dennis, 77, Scottish pop singer
 29
 Mac Davis, 78, American country singer-songwriter
 Rocco Prestia, 69, American funk bassist (Tower of Power)
 Helen Reddy, 78, Australian-American pop singer

October
 2 – Lisa Schouw, Australian pop singer (Girl Overboard)
 3 
 Karel Fiala, 95, Czech opera singer
 Anthony Galindo, 41, Venezuelan pop singer (Menudo, MDO)
 6
 Johnny Nash, 80, American pop and reggae singer-songwriter 
 Eddie Van Halen, 65, Dutch-born American hard rock guitarist and keyboardist (Van Halen)
 7 – Ray Pennington, 86, American country singer-songwriter
 8 
 Brian Locking, 81, British rock and roll bassist (The Shadows)
 Mohammad-Reza Shajarian, 80, Iranian classical singer
 9
 David Refael ben Ami, 70, Israeli religious singer
 Pierre Kezdy, 58, American punk rock bassist (Naked Raygun, Pegboy, Strike Under)
 11 
 Harold Betters, 92, American jazz trombonist
 Rajan, 87, Indian film composer (Rajan–Nagendra)
 12 
 Jon Gibson, 80, American minimalist multi-instrumentalist (Philip Glass Ensemble)
 Kim Massie, 62, American blues and soul singer
 13 – Saint Dog, 44, American rapper (Kottonmouth Kings)
 14 – Paul Matters, Australian hard rock bassist (AC/DC)
 15 – Dave Munden, 76, British rock and roll drummer (The Tremeloes)
 16 
 Johnny Bush, 85, American country singer-songwriter
 Gordon Haskell, 74, British progressive rock and jazz singer and bassist (King Crimson, The Fleur de Lys)
 P. S. Narayanaswamy, 86, Indian Carnatic singer
 17 – Toshinori Kondo, 71, Japanese jazz trumpeter
 18 
 Alfredo Cerruti, 78, Italian comedy rock musician and producer (Squallor)
 Naâma, 84, Tunisian pop singer
 José Padilla, 64, Spanish ambient DJ and producer
 Maisa Tsuno, 29, Japanese indie rock guitarist (Akai Ko-en)
 Chet "JR" White, 40, American indie rock bassist (Girls)
 19 
 Spencer Davis, 81, Welsh rock guitarist (The Spencer Davis Group)
 Tony Lewis, 62, British pop rock singer and guitarist (The Outfield)
 21 
 Zero Babu, 80, Indian playback and Carnatic singer
 Viola Smith, 107, American swing and classical drummer
 22
 Margie Bowes, 79, American country singer
 K. Deep, 79, Burmese folk singer
 23 – Jerry Jeff Walker, 78, American country singer-songwriter
 25 
 Dolores Abril, 81, Spanish copla singer
 Jan Boerman, 97, Dutch electronic composer
 Rosanna Carteri, 89, Italian opera singer
 Mahesh Kanodia, 83, Indian Gujarati film singer
 26 – Stan Kesler, 92, American rock and roll guitarist and songwriter
 28 
 Cano Estremera, 62, Puerto Rican salsa singer
 Billy Joe Shaver, 81, American country singer-songwriter
 29 – Denise Ferri, 76, American pop singer (The Delicates)
 30 – Božidar Tanaskovic, Serbian alternative rock bassist (Bjesovi)
 31 
 Rance Allen, 71, American gospel singer, guitarist and keyboardist (The Rance Allen Group)
 Marc Fosset, 71, French jazz guitarist
 MF Doom, 49, British-American rapper (KMD, Madvillain)

November
 1
 Pedro Iturralde, 91, Spanish jazz saxophonist
 Phil K, 51, Australian electronic DJ (Lostep)
 Nikki McKibbin, 42, American pop rock singer
 Ronnie Peel, Australian rock guitarist (The La De Da's, Thunderclap Newman)
 Esteban Santos, 69, Spanish pop singer (Bravo)
 2 – T. N. Krishnan, 92, Indian Carnatic violinist
 4 – Ken Hensley, 75, British rock singer, keyboardist and guitarist (Uriah Heep, Toe Fat, The Gods)
 5
 Len Barry, 78, American soul singer
 Reynaert, 65, Belgian pop singer
 Ossi Runne, 93, Belgian pop trumpeter and conductor
 6
 Stefano D'Orazio, 72, Italian pop drummer (Pooh)
 King Von, 26, American rapper
 Jim Radford, 92, British folk singer-songwriter
 Timur Selçuk, 74, Turkish pop singer and pianist
 7
 Cándido Camero, 99, Cuban jazz percussionist
 Bones Hillman, 62, New Zealand alternative rock bassist (Midnight Oil, The Swingers, Suburban Reptiles)
 8 – Oscar Benton, 71, Dutch blues singer
 10 – Alec Baillie, American punk rock bassist (Choking Victim, Leftöver Crack)
 11 
 Adrian Cionco, 48, Argentine rock bassist (La Mosca Tsé - Tsé)
 MO3, 28, American rapper
 Andrew White, 78, American jazz saxophonist
 12 – Jim Tucker, 74, American pop rock guitarist (The Turtles)
 13 
 Kićo Slabinac, 76, Croatian folk singer
 Doug Supernaw, 60, American country singer
 14 
 Des O'Connor, 88, English comedian and pop singer
 Eugenia Ratti, 87, Italian opera singer
 16 – Bruce Swedien, 86, American recording engineer
 18 
 László Benkő, 77, Hungarian progressive rock keyboardist (Omega)
 Dominic Grant, 71, British pop singer (Guys 'n' Dolls)
 Tony Hooper, 81, British folk rock guitarist (Strawbs)
 21 – Tamás Mihály, 73, Hungarian progressive rock bassist (Omega)
 23 – Hal Ketchum, 67, American country singer-songwriter
 25
 Duris Maxwell, 74, Canadian rock drummer
 Flor Silvestre, 90, Mexican ranchera and huapango singer and actress
 Camilla Wicks, 92, American classical violinist
 26 
 Allan Botschinsky, 80, Danish jazz trumpeter
 Cecilia Fusco, 87, Italian opera singer
 Jamir Garcia, 42, Filipino nu metal singer (Slapshock)
 28 – Piotr Strojnowski, 62, Polish reggae singer and guitarist (Daab)
 29 – Miša Aleksić, 67, Serbian hard rock bassist (Riblja Čorba)
 30 – Jack Wray, 81, American doo-wop singer (The Earls)

December
 1 – Dan Morrison, Australian ska punk drummer (Area-7)
 2
 Volodymyr Huba, 81, Ukrainian film composer
 Ron Mathewson, 76, British jazz bassist
 3 – André Gagnon, 84, Canadian pianist, composer, and arranger
 4 – Kenny Jeremiah, 78, American garage-rock singer (Soul Survivors)
 6 – Džej Ramadanovski, 56, Serbian folk pop singer
 7
 LD Beghtol, 55, American experimental rock singer and multi-instrumentalist (LD & the New Criticism, Flare Acoustic Arts League, The Magnetic Fields)
 Howard Wales, 77, American jazz and rock keyboardist
 8 – Harold Budd, 84, American avant-garde composer and poet
 9
 Sean Malone, 50, American progressive rock bassist (Gordian Knot, Cynic)
 Jason Slater, 49, American alternative rock bassist (Third Eye Blind, Snake River Conspiracy, Brougham)
 10 – Kenneth Alwyn, 95, British classical composer and conductor
 11 – Ubirany, 80, Brazilian samba hand-repique player (Fundo de Quintal)
 12 – Charley Pride, 86, American country singer
 13 – Andrey Sapunov, 64, Russian rock guitarist and bassist (Voskreseniye)
 14 – Paulinho, 68, Brazilian soft rock singer (Roupa Nova)
 15 
 Albert Griffiths, 74, Jamaican reggae singer and guitarist (The Gladiators)
 Corlynn Hanney, 75, American pop-soul singer (The Groop)
 Sam Jayne, 46, American indie rock singer and guitarist (Love as Laughter, Lync)
 16 – Carl Mann, 78, American rockabilly singer
 17 
 Jeff Clayton, 66, American jazz saxophonist
 Stanley Cowell, 79, American jazz pianist (The Heath Brothers)
 19
 Pelle Alsing, 60, Swedish pop rock drummer (Roxette)
 Clay Anthony, 61, American hard rock bassist (Junkyard)
 Pepe Salvaderi, Italian rock guitarist (Dik Dik)
 20 – Chad Stuart, 79, British folk-pop singer and guitarist (Chad & Jeremy)
 21 – K. T. Oslin, 78, American country singer-songwriter
 23
 John “Ecstasy” Fletcher, 56, American rapper (Whodini)
 Leslie West, 75, American hard rock singer and guitarist (Mountain, West, Bruce and Laing, The Vagrants)
 24 
 Ivry Gitlis, 98, Israeli classical violinist
 Mojmir Sepe, 90, Slovenian classical composer and conductor
 Geoff Stephens, 86, English songwriter and record producer, founder of The New Vaudeville Band
 25 – Tony Rice, 69, American bluegrass guitarist (New South)
 26 – Tito Rojas, 65, Puerto Rican salsa singer
 28
 Paul-Heinz Dittrich, 90, German composer
 Armando Manzanero, 85, Mexican Mayan musician
 29 
 Claude Bolling, 90, French jazz pianist and composer
 Phyllis McGuire, 89, American pop singer (The McGuire Sisters)
 Rudy Salas, 72, American R&B and soul guitarist (El Chicano, Tierra)
 30 
 Frank Kimbrough, 64, American jazz pianist
 Alto Reed, 72, American rock saxophonist (Bob Seger & the Silver Bullet Band)
 Eugene Wright, 97, American jazz bassist (Dave Brubeck Quartet)

See also

Timeline of musical events
Women in music
Impact of the COVID-19 pandemic on the music industry

References

 
2020-related lists
Music by year
Music
Culture-related timelines by year